Mok Mareth (born 20 January 1944) is a Cambodian politician and former Minister of the Environment. He was born in Rumchang, Samraŏng District, Takéo Province, Cambodia.

Political career
Mareth was named a Senior Minister in the Cambodian Government in 2004 and is a member of the ruling Cambodian People's Party. He served as head of the Ministry of Environment from 1993 to 2013. Mok was also elected a Member of Parliament for Takeo province in 2003. He formerly served as Vice Minister of Agriculture (1989–1993) and Vice Governor of Phnom Penh (1980–1989). Prior to these positions he served as vice president  of the Phnom Penh party committee (1981–1989).

Studies
A natural scientist by training, Mareth earned a bachelor's degree in agronomy and fisheries engineering from the University of Agronomy, Phnom Penh, Cambodia in 1970 and his PhD in animal and aquatic biology from Paul Sabatier University, in Toulouse, France in 1974. After completing his doctoral work, he was a biological researcher at ORSTROM in France (1974–1976).

References

1944 births
Members of the National Assembly (Cambodia)
Living people
Cambodian People's Party politicians
Government ministers of Cambodia
University of Toulouse alumni